The Derek Allen Prize is awarded by the British Academy. It was founded in 1976 to honour Derek Allen, FBA, who was secretary (1969–73) and treasurer (1973–75) of the British Academy. It was established by his widow and sons to recognise outstanding scholarly achievement in Allen's principal interests: numismatics, Celtic studies and musicology. Although awarded annually, the prize rotates between the three disciplines. Recipients are awarded £400.

List of recipients
The following had been awarded the prize:

20th-century

 1977 (musicology): Professor Oliver Strunk
 1978 (numismatics): Dr Karel Castelin
 1979 (Celtic studies): Professor Kenneth Jackson
 1980 (musicology): Dr Julian Budden
 1981 (numismatics): J. B. Colbert de Beaulieu
 1982 (Celtic studies): Professor Brian Ó Cuiv
 1983 (musicology): Dr David Brown
 1984 (numismatics): Dr Simone Scheers
 1985 (Celtic studies): Professor J. E. Caerwyn Williams
 1986 (musicology): Professor Reinhard Strohm
 1987 (numismatics): Dr Georges Le Rider
 1988 (Celtic studies): Professor Edouard Bachellery
 1989 (musicology): Professor J. E. Stevens
 1990 (numismatics): Dr P. Bastien
 1991 (Celtic studies): Professor K. H. Schmidt
 1992 (musicology): David Cairns
 1993 (numismatics): Jean Lafaurie
 1994 (Celtic studies): Professor Emeritus Eric P. Hamp
 1995 (musicology): Dr Peter Holman
 1996 (numismatics): Dr J. P. C. Kent
 1997 (Celtic studies): Professor Proinsias Mac Cana
 1998 (musicology): Professor Peter Walls
 1999 (numismatics): Cécile Morrisson

21st-century

 2000 (Celtic studies): Professor Derick Thomson, FBA
 2001 (musicology): Dr Janice Stockigt
 2002 (numismatics): Professor Dr Gert Hatz
 2003 (Celtic studies): Professor Pádraig Ó Riain
 2004 (musicology): Professor Colin Timms
 2005 (numismatics): Professor Philip Grierson, FBA
 2006 (Celtic studies): Daniel Huws
 2007 (musicology): Professor Philip V. Bohlman
 2008 (numismatics): Professor Michael Metcalf, Emeritus Professor of Numismatics, University of Oxford
 2009 (Celtic studies): Yr Athro Dafydd Jenkins, Emeritus Professor of Legal History and Welsh Law, University of Aberystwyth
 2010 (musicology): Professor Gary Tomlinson, Walter H. Annenberg Professor in the Humanities, University of Pennsylvania
 2011 (numismatics): Dr Mark Blackburn, Keeper, Department of Coins and Medals, Fitzwilliam Museum, Cambridge
 2012 (Celtic studies): Professor Fergus Kelly, Dublin Institute for Advanced Studies
 2013 (musicology): Professor Arnold Whittall, King's College London
 2014 (numismatics): Dr Richard Reece, University College London
 2015 (Celtic studies): Professor Pierre-Yves Lambert, Centre national de la recherche scientifique
 2016 (musicology): Dr Margaret Bent, CBE, FBA, University of Oxford
 2017 (numismatics): Professor Michael Crawford, FBA, University College London
 2018 (Celtic studies): Professor Máire Herbert, MRIA, University College Cork
 2019 (musicology): Alejandro Planchart
 2020 (numismatics): Dr Andrew Burnett
 2021 (Celtic studies): Professor Ralph A. Griffiths

See also
 Awards of the British Academy

References

British Academy
Awards for numismatics
Celtic studies
Musicology
Academic awards
British awards
Awards established in 1976
1976 establishments in the United Kingdom